The 1960 season was the 55th season of competitive football in Norway.

Hovedserien 1959/60

Group A

Group B

Championship final
June 15: Fredrikstad - Lillestrøm 6 - 2

Bronze final
June 16: Eik - Vålerengen 4 - 2

Landsdelsserien

Group Østland/Søndre

Group Østland/Nordre

Group Sørland/Vestland, A

Group Sørland/Vestland, B

Group Sørland/Vestland, C

Group Møre

Group Trøndelag

Play-off Sørland/Vestland
        Vindbjart - Stavanger 2-3
        Årstad - Vindbjart 5-2
        Stavanger - Årstad 4-2

Play-off Møre/Trøndelag
Rosenborg - Kristiansund 4 - 0

Kristiansund - Rosenborg 0 - 5 (agg. 0 - 9)

Rosenborg promoted

Third Division

District I
 1. Askim           (Promoted)
 2. Sprint/Jeløy
 3. Hafslund
 4. Ørje
 5. Navestad
 6. Gresvik
 7. Tune
 8. Mysen

District II, group A
 1. Geithus         (Play-off)
 2. Vestfossen
 3. Strømsgodset
 4. Spartacus
 5. Åssiden
 6. Kjelsås
 7. Sørli
 8. Ski

District II, group B
 1. Drammens BK     (Play-off)
 2. Aurskog
 3. Grue
 5. Liull
 6. Slemmestad
 7. Røa
 8. Bjørkelangen
 9. Aasen

District III, group A (Oplandene)
 1. Fremad          (Play-off)
 2. Mesna
 3. Gjøvik SK
 4. Lena
 5. Hamarkameratene
 6. Hamar IL
 7. Stange
 8. Biri

District III, group B1 (Sør-Østerdal)
 1. Nybergsund      (Play-off)
 2. Elverum
 3. Ytre Rendal
 4. Trysilgutten
 5. Koppang
 6. Innsats
 7. Engerdal

District III, group B2 (Sør-Gudbrandsdal)
 1. Kvam            (Play-off)
 2. Fåvang
 3. Follebu
 4. Vinstra
 5. Sør-Fron
 6. Øyer 	(withdrew)

District III, group B3 (Nord-Gudbrandsdal)
 1. Dovre           (Play-off)

Table unknown.

District IV, group A (Vestfold)
 1. Ørn             	(Play-off)
 2. Runar
 3. Falk
 4. Holmestrand
 5. Tønsberg Turn
 6. Tønsbergkam.
 7. Teie
 8. Borre

District IV, group B (Grenland)
 1. Skiens-Grane    (Play-off)
 2. Urædd
 3. Brevik
 4. Langesund
 5. Herkules
 6. Kragerø
 7. Storm
 8. Skidar

District IV, group B (Øvre-Telemark)
 1. Rjukan          	(Play-off)
 2. Heddal
 3. Ulefoss
 4. Drangedal
 5. Skade
 6. Sportsklubben 31

District V, group A1 (Aust-Agder)
 1. Rygene          	(Play-off)
 2. Risør
 3. Dristug
 4. Arendals BK
 5. Tvedestrand
 6. Froland 		(withdrew)

District V, group A2 (Vest-Agder)
 1. Våg             	(Play-off)
 2. Mandalskam.
 3. Vigør
 4. Torridal
 5. Farsund
 6. Lyngdal

District V, group B1 (Rogaland)
 1. Jarl            		(Play-off)
 2. Nærbø
 3. Randaberg
 4. Klepp
 5. Varhaug
 6. Orre

District V, group B2 (Rogaland)
 1. Ulf             (Play-off)
 2. Riska
 3. Buøy
 4. Ålgård
 5. Vaulen
 6. Åkra

District V, group C (Sunnhordland)
 1. Stord           	(Play-off)
 2. Odda
 3. Rubbestadnes
 4. Fonna
 5. Solid
 6. Halsnøy

District VI, group A (Bergen)
 1. Trane           	(Play-off)
 2. Djerv
 3. Hardy
 4. Fjellkameratene
 5. Laksevåg
 6. Baune
 7. Ny-Krohnborg

District VI, group B (Midthordland)
 1. Voss            		(Play-off)
 2. Erdal
 3. Follese
 4. Kjøkkelvik
 5. Florvåg
 6. Arna
 7. Dale (Dalekvam)

District VII, group A (Sunnmøre)
 1. Herd            	(Play-off)
 2. Aksla
 3. Rollon
 4. Ørsta
 5. Velled./Ringen
 6. Volda
 7. Sykkylven
 8. Spjelkavik

District VII, group B (Romsdal)
 1. Træff           		(Play-off)
 2. Nord-Gossen
 3. Eidsvåg (Romsdal)
 4. Eide
 5. Åndalsnes
 6. Isfjorden
 7. Bud

District VII, group C (Nordmøre)
 1. Framtid         (Play-off)
 2. Dahle
 3. Nordlandet
 4. Sunndal
 5. Goma
 6. Todalen
 7. Bjørn
 8. Vågen

District VIII, group A (Sør-Trøndelag)
 1. Løkken          (Play-off)
 2. Orkanger
 3. Vikavarvet
 4. Svorkmo
 5. Leik
 6. Troll
 7. Melhus
 8. Flå

District VIII, group B (Trondheim og omegn)
 1. Falken          		(Play-off)
 2. Tryggkameratene
 3. National
 4. Trondheims/Ørn
 5. Wing
 6. Trond
 7. NTHI
 8. Nidar

District VIII, group C (Fosen)
 1. Opphaug         	(Play-off)
 2. Fevåg
 3. Brekstad
 4. Stadsbygd
 5. Beian
 6. Hasselvika
 7. Nes IL 		(Disqualified)

District VIII, group D (Nord-Trøndelag/Namdal)
 1. Fram (Skatval)  	(Play-off)
 2. Stjørdals/Blink
 3. Verdal
 4. Namsos
 5. Snåsa
 6. Malm
 7. Leksvik
 8. Byafossen

District IX
 1. Bodø/Glimt
 2. Brønnøysund
 3. Stålkameratene
 4. Mo
 5. Mosjøen
 6. Vega

District X
 1. Narvik/Nor
 2. Harstad
 3. Mjølner
 4. Tromsø
 5. Lia-Brage
 6. Skarp

Play-off District II
Drammen BK - Geithus 5 - 3
Geithus - Drammens BK 4 - 1 (agg. 7 - 9)

Geithus promoted

Play-off District III
 1. Kvam             	(Play-off)
 - - - - - - - - - - - - - - - - - - -
 2. Dovre
 3. Nybergsund

Fremad - Kbam 8 - 1
Kvam - Fremad 1 - 3 (agg. 2 - 11)

Fremad promoted

Play-off District IV
Ørn - Rjukan 6 - 0
Skiens-Grane - Ørn 1 - 2
Rjukan - Skiens-Grane 2 - 4

Play-off District V
Rygene - Våg 1 - 2
Våg - Rygene 6 - 1 (agg. 8 - 2)

Våg promoted

Jarl - Ulf 0 - 2
Ulf - Jarl 2 - 1 (agg. 4 - 1)

Ulf promoted

Jarl - Stord 2 - 2, after extra time (in Kopervik)
Jarl - Stord 2 - 1 (in Haugesund)

Jarl promoted

Championship District V
Våg - Ulf (not played)

Championship District VI
Trane - Voss 4 - 1

Trane promoted

Play-off District VII
Træff - Herd 0 - 5
Herd - Framtid 4 - 0
Framtid - Træff 6 - 0

Play-off District VIII
Opphaug - Løkken 4 - 5
Falken - Fram 3 - 1
Opphaug - Falken 0 - 2
Fram - Løkken 4 - 1
Løkken - Falken 0 - 3
Fram - Opphaug 5 - 3

Norwegian Cup

Final

Replay

Northern Norwegian Cup

Final

European Cups

Norwegian representatives
Fredrikstad (Champions cup)

Champions Cup

Preliminary round
August 31: Fredrikstad - Ajax (Netherlands) 4 - 3
September 7: Ajax - Fredrikstad 0 - 0 (agg. 3 - 4)

First round
October 9: AGF Aarhus (Denmark) - Fredrikstad 3 - 0
October 16: Fredrikstad - AGF Aarhus 0 - 1 (agg. 0 - 4)

National team

Note: Norway's goals first

 
Seasons in Norwegian football